Jürgen Roth (4 November 1945 – 28 September 2017) was a German publicist and investigative journalist.

Bibliography
1971: Armut in der Bundesrepublik
1972: Ist die Bundesrepublik Deutschland ein Polizeistaat?
1973: Partner Türkei oder Foltern für die Freiheit des Westens?
1974: Bundeswehr, BGS, Polizei, Hüter der Verfassung?
1975: Z.B. Frankfurt, die Zerstörung einer Stadt
1977: Aufstand im wilden Kurdistan
1978: Geographie der Unterdrückten
1981: Die Türkei – Republik unter Wölfen
1982: "Es ist halt so ..."
1984: Dunkelmänner der Macht
1985: Zeitbombe Armut
1986: Makler des Todes
1987: Rambo
1987: Das zensierte Buch: Geschäfte und Verbrechen der Politmafia
1988: Die illegalen deutschen Waffengeschäfte und ihre internationalen Verflechtungen
1990: Die Mitternachtsregierung
1992: Sie töten für Geld
1992: Verbrecher-Holding
1995: Der Sumpf
1996: Die Russen-Mafia
1997: Absturz
1999: Die Graue Eminenz 
1999: Die roten Bosse
2000: Schmutzige Hände: Wie die westlichen Staaten mit der Drogenmafia kooperieren, Goldmann, 
2001: Der Oligarch
2002: Netzwerke des Terrors
2003: Die Gangster aus dem Osten
2004: Ermitteln verboten!
2005: Gejagt von der Polenmafia, Eichborn, 
2006: Der Deutschland-Clan: Das skrupellose Netzwerk aus Politikern, Top-Managern und Justiz, 
2007: Anklage unerwünscht: Korruption und Willkür in der deutschen Justiz, Eichborn-Verlag, 
2016: Schmutzige Demokratie: Ausgehöhlt - Ausgenutzt - Ausgelöscht?, Ecowin Verlag,

External links

1945 births
2017 deaths
German male writers
Journalists from Frankfurt
German male journalists
20th-century German journalists
21st-century German journalists